The 1934 World Table Tennis Championships women's singles was the eighth edition of the women's singles championship. The Championships were held in December 1933 but are officially listed as the 1934 Championships.
Marie Kettnerová defeated Astrid Krebsbach in the final by three sets to one, to win the title.

Results

See also
List of World Table Tennis Championships medalists

References

-
_